Dallinella is a genus of brachiopods belonging to the family Terebrataliidae.

The species of this genus are found in Northern America.

Species:

Dallinella obsoleta 
Dallinella occidentalis

References

Brachiopod genera